Peters Creek is a  long 2nd order tributary to Allen Creek in Pittsylvania County, Virginia.

Course 
Peters Creek rises in a pond at Cody, Virginia in Halifax County and then flows southwest into Pittsylvania County to join Allen Creek about 0.5 miles west-northwest of Hermosa.

Watershed 
Peters Creek drains  of area, receives about 45.2 in/year of precipitation, has a wetness index of 379.91, and is about 65% forested.

See also 
 List of Virginia Rivers

References 

Rivers of Virginia
Rivers of Halifax County, Virginia
Rivers of Pittsylvania County, Virginia
Tributaries of the Roanoke River